Zerby may refer to
Zerby Derby, a British-Canadian live-action television preschool series
Harold Zerby (1902–1963), American football player 
Karen Zerby (born 1946), leader of The Family International, and American religious movement 
Kim Darby (born Deborah Zerby in 1947), American actress
Shooting of Douglas Zerby in Long Beach, California in 2010